Nerdapalooza was an annual nerd music and arts festival in Orlando, Florida, United States, the first of its kind to invite all genres of the nerd music movement under one roof, including geek rock, nerdcore, chiptune, and video game music. The festival was conceived by John "hex" Carter, who hosted a nerdy music themed radio show through KRFH, the student-run radio station at Humboldt State University. The word is derived from nerd and palooza, a reference to Lollapalooza.  Nerdapalooza, LLC was dissolved on October 29, 2013.

Nerdapalooza Southeast 2007
Nerdapalooza Southeast, the first Nerdapalooza event, was a nerd music festival centered in North Central Florida. The show showcased nerdcore.  It was organized by Rob Tobias.  Proceeds all went to benefit "The Purple House", a charity dedicated to helping the homeless.

Nerdapalooza Beta
Designed as a small show, it was sponsored by KRFH and was held in Arcata, California at the Kate Buchanan Room at Humboldt State University on September 22, 2007. Organized by John "hex" Carter.

Nerdapalooza UK
Nerdapalooza UK was the United Kingdom equivalent of the American nerd music festival. Unlike its United States counterpart, it consisted of fewer artists and was a free event. Although supported by Nerdapalooza US's creator, the creator and organizer of Nerdapalooza UK was Stephen "MisterB" Brunton.

Nerdapalooza Southeast 2008
A continuation of the previous years show, Nerdapalooza Southeast was again organized by Rob Tobias. However, Carter moved to Orlando, Florida in late 2007 to act as co-organizer. Michael "The Spork" Evans and Nicholas "Sir-Up" Carman were also key coordinators for the success of this event. The show was also hosted by 3 local radio DJ's from 91.5 WPRK. Josh Thew and Logan Donahoo of "Serious Business" along with Andrew Grey of "Talk Nerdy To Me". The event was to benefit Child's Play charity and had been the most successful of all of the Nerdapaloozas thus far, receiving press coverage from both bloggers and print media, including an article released in Blender Magazine.

Nerdapalooza 2009
Held July 11 and 12, 2009, the first full Nerdapalooza showcasing all nerd music, it was again a charity show with proceeds going to Penny Arcade's "Child's Play" charity.  Carter became Executive Director, along with other key directors Michael "The Spork" Evans, Joshua Thew, and Aaron "Masurao" Yarhouse. Official presenters were the members of the Letters Versus Numbers podcast among them Nerdapalooza UK organizer Stephen "MisterB" Brunton.

This show was the first time that the four major players in the nerdcore music scene (MC Frontalot, MC Lars, MC Chris, YTCracker ) all performed at the same event.

Nerdapalooza 2010
Held July 17 and 18, 2010 at the Orlando Airport Marriott, this Nerdapalooza marked the first year that the festival operated as its own company managed by John Carter and Aaron Yarhouse, along with press and talent directors Nina Talley and Josh Thew, respectively. The events fund raising will once again support the Child's Play charity.

In 2010 the show was presented by Nerdy Show, the official podcast of Nerdapalooza that Executive Director, John Carter is a co-host of along with Brian Clevinger, "Triforce" Mike Pandel, and Cap Blackard.

Nerdapalooza 2011
Nerdapalooza 2011 was held on July 16 and 17, 2011, again at the Orlando Airport Marriott. Headlined by The Protomen and I Fight Dragons, Nerdapalooza 2011 also featured The Bossfights, Sci-Fried, Marc With a C, and Captain Dan and the Scurvy Crew, amongst many others. In addition to the concerts, visual artists such as Dan Hay and Tony Baldini were featured in the art gallery.

The official presenters of Nerdapalooza 2011 were Schaffer The Darklord and Nelson Lugo.

Shinobi Ninja was named best new band.

Nerdapalooza 2012
Nerdapalooza 2012 took place August 3–5, 2012 at The Social and The Beacham in downtown Orlando, FL. Top billings were Koo Koo Kanga Roo, Metroid Metal, Math the Band, and others. The Protomen headlined both August 4 and 5, the latter with a full Queen cover set. Over 800 people were in attendance. The event was dedicated to the memories of Michael "Triforce Mike" Pandel and Joshua "MC Gigahertz" Montgomery.

Nerdapalooza 2013
Nerdapalooza 2013 took place October 18–20, 2013 in the West Concourse or the Orange County Convention Center in Orlando, FL. The headlining acts on Saturday and Sunday were Nerf Herder and They Might Be Giants, respectively.
Disagreements within the company saw two members resign before the remaining members dissolved the company a week after the close of the event. They Might Be Giants management sued John Carter, Josh Thew, and Bryan Kissel over breach of contract for failure to pay, with their case against Kissel being dismissed in 2017. They Might Be Giants' case against Josh Thew was dropped in early 2019.

Event history

References

External links 
 Official Nerdapalooza Website Wayback Machine archive from Oct 22, 2013
 Wired Magazine
 Northcoast Journal

Music festivals in Orlando, Florida
Nerd music